Cheq Wong may refer to:
 Cheq Wong language, a language of the Jahaic languages branch spoken in Malaysia
 Cheq Wong people, an indigenous Orang Asli people from Malaysia